Agrati was an Italian motorcycle company who built scooters and mopeds between 1958 and 1965.
In 1961 Agrati was merged with Garelli Motorcycles, and from 1965 all bikes were produced under the Garelli name.

See also 

List of Italian companies
List of motorcycle manufacturers

References

External links
 A-Z of Motorcycles 1960 80cc Capri scooter

Defunct motorcycle manufacturers of Italy
Defunct motor vehicle manufacturers of Italy
Vehicle manufacturing companies established in 1958
Italian companies established in 1958